The Shreveport–Bossier Captains were a professional baseball team based in Shreveport, Louisiana, in the United States. Following the 2011 season, the team was sold to new ownership and moved to Laredo, Texas, to continue play as the Laredo Lemurs. The Captains were a member of the South Division of the American Association of Independent Professional Baseball, which was not affiliated with Major League Baseball at the time. From the 2003 season to the 2011 season, the Captains played their home games at Shreveport's Fair Grounds Field.

The latest incarnation of the Captains was founded in 2003 as the Shreveport–Bossier Sports, after the Class-AA Texas League Shreveport Swamp Dragons moved to Frisco, Texas, to become the RoughRiders.  On January 8, 2009, the Captains unveiled their new name (themed as a pirate captain rather than a tribute to Captain Henry Miller Shreve, the founder of Shreveport), logo, and color scheme; unlike prior teams, this incarnation of the Captains also encompasses neighboring Bossier City in its locale name.

After the 2010 season, the Captains' owners were awarded an American Association team to be based in Amarillo to replace a United League Baseball team.  At first it was assumed the Captains would be relocating to Amarillo.  However, the Pensacola Pelicans' owners later purchased the Carolina Mudcats and folded the American Association incarnation of the team for the 2011 season so that the Mudcats could relocate to Pensacola for the 2012 baseball season.  This move was expected to keep the Captains in Shreveport and in the American Association for the foreseeable future. However, the Shreveport–Bossier Captains announced on November 29, 2011, that the team had been sold to a new ownership group and would move. The team was purchased by Laredo Baseball Investors, LLC.

History of Shreveport baseball

Professional baseball has been in Shreveport at various levels since 1895, including several teams named the Shreveport Sports and one prior team named the Shreveport Captains:
1895 — Shreveport Grays (Texas-Southern League)
1901–1903 — Shreveport Giants (Southern Association)
1904–1907 — Shreveport Pirates (Southern Association)
1908–1910 — Shreveport Pirates (Texas League)
1915–1924 — Shreveport Gassers (Texas League)
1925–1932 — Shreveport Sports (Texas League)
1933 — Shreveport Sports (Dixie League)
1934 — Shreveport Sports (East Dixie League)
1935 — Shreveport Sports (West Dixie League)
1938–1942 — Shreveport Sports (Texas League)
1946–1957 — Shreveport Sports (Texas League)
1959–1961 — Shreveport Sports (Southern Association)
1968–1970 — Shreveport Braves (Texas League)
1971–2000 — Shreveport Captains (Texas League)
2001–2002 — Shreveport Swamp Dragons (Texas League)
2003–2005 — Shreveport Sports (Central League)
2006–2008 — Shreveport Sports (American Association)
2009–2011 — Shreveport–Bossier Captains (American Association)

Major leaguers who played in a Shreveport uniform
Tony Peña (Pirates, Cardinals, Red Sox, Indians, White Sox, and Astros)  (Baseball Hall of Fame inductee)-----(Captains)
Mike Aldrete (SF Giants, Montreal Expos, SD Padres, CLE Indians, Oakland Athletics, CA Angels, NY Yankees)-----(Captains)
Marvin Benard (SF Giants)-----(Captains)
Pedro Feliz (SF Giants)-----(Captains)
Randall Johnson (Engine 12 C) ----(SwampDragons)
Royce Clayton (SF Giants, STL Cardinals, TX Rangers, CHI White Sox, Milwaukee Brewers, CO Rockies, AZ Diamondbacks, WA Nationals)-----(Captains)
Russ Ortiz (Giants, Braves, Diamondbacks, Orioles)-----(Captains)
Yorvit Torrealba (Giants, Rockies, Mariners)-----(Captains)
Chili Davis (Giants, Angels, Yankees, Twins, Royals)-----(Captains)
Bill Mueller (Giants, Cubs, Red Sox, Dodgers)-----(Captains)
Doug Mirabelli (Giants, Red Sox, Rangers, Padres)-----(Captains)
George Sisler (Browns, Braves) (Baseball Hall of Fame inductee)-----(Sports)
Al Simmons (Philadelphia A's, White Sox, Senators) (Baseball Hall of Fame inductee)-----(Gassers)
Zack Wheat (Brooklyn Dodgers, Philadelphia A's) (Baseball Hall of Fame inductee)-----(Sports)
Bill Terry (New York Giants) (Baseball Hall of Fame inductee)-----(Sports)
Dusty Baker (Braves, Dodgers, A's)-----(Shreveport Braves)
Ralph Garr (Braves, White Sox, Angels)-----(Shreveport Braves)
Tom O'Malley (Giants, Mets, Orioles, Rangers)-----(Captains)
Rick Honeycutt (Mariners, Dodgers, A's, Rangers, Cardinals)-----(Captains)
Sixto Lezcano (Brewers, Padres, Phillies, Cardinals)-----(Captains)
Ramón Martínez (Giants, Cubs, Tigers, Phillies, Dodgers)-----(Captains)
Calvin Murray (Giants, Rangers, Cubs)-----(Captains)
Aaron Fultz (Giants, Rangers, Twins, Phillies)-----(Captains)
Chris Singleton (White Sox, Orioles, A's, Devil Rays)-----(Captains)
Rich Aurilia (Giants, Mariners, Reds)-----(Captains)
Jay Canizaro (Giants, Twins)-----(Captains)
Keith Foulke (Giants, White Sox, Red Sox)-----(Captains)
Dennis Cook (Giants, Indians, Mets, Angels)-----(Captains)
Damon Minor (SF Giants)-----(Captains)
Joe Nathan (Giants, Twins, Rangers)-----(Captains, Swamp Dragons)
Lance Niekro (SF Giants)-----(Swamp Dragons)
Jesse Foppert (SF Giants)-----(Swamp Dragons)
Scott Linebrink (Giants, Astros, Padres, Brewers, White Sox, Braves)-----(Captains)
John Burkett (SF Giants, Texas Rangers, Atlanta Braves, Boston Red Sox)-----(Captains)
Jeff Brantley (SF Giants, Reds, Cardinals, Philies, Rangers)-----(Captains)
Joey Gathright (Devil Rays, Royals, Cubs, Red Sox)-----(Captains)
Nate Bump (Marlins)-----(Captains)

Championships
1919 Texas League Championship (Gassers)
1942 Texas League Championship (Sports)
1952 Texas League Championship (Sports)
1955 Texas League Championship (Sports)
1990 Texas League Championship (Captains)
1991 Texas League Championship (Captains)
1995 Texas League Championship (Captains)
2010 American Association Championship (Captains)

Ballparks
Gasser Park 1915–1924 
Biedenharn Park 1925–1932
Texas League Park 1938–1942, 1946–1957 
Bonneau Peters Field 1968 
Braves Field 1968–1970 
SPAR Stadium 1971–1985
 Fair Grounds Field 1986–2011

Major league affiliation
1923–1924: Philadelphia A's
1939, 1942, 1946: Chicago White Sox
1968–1970: Atlanta Braves
1971–1972: California Angels
1973–1974: Milwaukee Brewers
1975–1978: Pittsburgh Pirates
1979–2002: San Francisco Giants

Year-by-year results (bold denotes a postseason appearance)
2011	Shreveport–Bossier Captains	45	55	.450
2010	Shreveport–Bossier Captains	58	37	.611
2009	Shreveport–Bossier Captains	48	48	.500
2008	Shreveport Sports	        26	68	.277
2007	Shreveport Sports	        47	48	.495
2006 Shreveport Sports              54	39	.581
2005	Shreveport Sports	        46	48	.489
2004 Shreveport Sports	        50	45	.526
2003	Shreveport Sports	        51	44	.537
2002	Shreveport Swamp Dragons	60	79	.432
2001	Shreveport Swamp Dragons	54	81	.400
2000	Shreveport Captains	58	81	.417
1999	Shreveport Captains	71	69	.507
1998	Shreveport Captains	57	83	.407
1997	Shreveport Captains	76	62	.551 (Lost in TL Finals)
1996	Shreveport Captains	73	66	.525
1995	Shreveport Captains	88	47	.652
1994	Shreveport Captains	73	63	.537
1993	Shreveport Captains	66	70	.485
1992	Shreveport Captains	77	59	.566 (Lost in TL Finals)
1991	Shreveport Captains	86	50	.632
1990	Shreveport Captains	65	68	.489
1989	Shreveport Captains	75	61	.551
1988	Shreveport Captains	74	62	.544
1987	Shreveport Captains	78	57	.578
1986	Shreveport Captains	80	56	.588
1985	Shreveport Captains	72	64	.529
1984	Shreveport Captains	59	77	.434
1983	Shreveport Captains	72	64	.529
1982	Shreveport Captains	62	73	.459
1981	Shreveport Captains	68	67	.504
1980	Shreveport Captains	49	87	.360
1979	Shreveport Captains	73	62	.541
1978	Shreveport Captains	55	81	.404
1977	Shreveport Captains	62	68	.477
1976	Shreveport Captains	70	66	.515 (Lost in TL Finals)
1975	Shreveport Captains	76	52	.594
1974	Shreveport Captains	59	79	.428
1973	Shreveport Captains	70	68	.507
1972	Shreveport Captains	64	76	.457
1971	Shreveport Captains	69	73	.486

References

Defunct American Association of Professional Baseball teams
Defunct minor league baseball teams
Defunct independent baseball league teams
Baseball teams established in 2003
Capts
Professional baseball teams in Louisiana
2003 establishments in Louisiana
Baseball teams disestablished in 2011
2011 disestablishments in Louisiana
Defunct baseball teams in Louisiana